Diakonoffiana tricolorana is a species of moth of the family Tortricidae. It is found in New Caledonia, New Guinea and Australia, where it has been recorded from New South Wales and Queensland.

The wingspan is about 14 mm. The forewings are ochreous fuscous, with dark fuscous transverse lines and small crests of reddish-ochreous scales. The hindwings are pale reddish ochreous, suffused with fuscous towards the margins.

References

Moths described in 1881
Olethreutini